Lactophrys trigonus, commonly called the buffalo trunkfish or trunkfish, is a species of boxfish native to the Western Atlantic.

Description
The trunkfish has small diffuse white spots. Two areas, located on the pectoral region and halfway between gills and posterior end of carapace, contain dark-edged hexagonal plates that together form chain-like markings. It can reach a length of 30–50 cm and weigh up to 3.3 kg.

Distribution and habitat
The species is native to the Western Atlantic from Canada to Brazil, including the Gulf of Mexico, Bermuda and the Caribbean. Records from the Mediterranean still lack verification. It inhabits areas with coral rubble, seagrass beds and offshore reefs, preferring depths above .

Ecology
Boxfish are benthic feeders and will forage on seagrasses, crustaceans, mollusks, worms, tunicates and a variety of small benthic invertebrates.  They are a popular food throughout the Caribbean, and a minor species in the aquarium trade.

References

Ostraciidae
Fish described in 1758
Taxa named by Carl Linnaeus